The Shadow ministry of Deb Frecklington is the Liberal National Party opposition between December 2017 and November 2020, opposing the Palaszczuk government in the Parliament of Queensland. It was led by Deb Frecklington following her election as leader of the party and Opposition Leader on 12 December 2017. Tim Mander was the deputy party leader and Deputy Leader of the Opposition.

The shadow ministry was announced on 15 December 2017. It succeeded the Nicholls shadow ministry and was replaced by the Crisafulli shadow ministry on 16 November 2020.

See also

2020 Queensland state election
Second Palaszczuk Ministry

References

Frecklington